Davide Belotti (born 24 May 1972) is an Italian football coach and former player who played as a defender.

Career
Belotti was born in Bollate. Throughout his career, He played for Italian clubs Inter, Nola, Vicenza, Treviso, Monza, Seregno, Lecco, and AC Bellinzona, also spending a loan spell with Greek side AEK Athens in 2000. Whilst at Vicenza he won the 1996–97 Coppa Italia.

Honours
Vicenza
Coppa Italia: 1996–97

References

External links
AC Bellinzona profile

1972 births
Living people
People from Bollate
Sportspeople from the Metropolitan City of Milan
Italian footballers
Footballers from Lombardy
Association football defenders
Calcio Lecco 1912 players
Treviso F.B.C. 1993 players
L.R. Vicenza players
A.C. Monza players
AC Bellinzona players
AEK Athens F.C. players
U.S. 1913 Seregno Calcio players
Italian expatriate footballers
Italian expatriate sportspeople in Greece
Expatriate footballers in Greece
Italian expatriate sportspeople in Switzerland
Expatriate footballers in Switzerland